Zemidan-e Bala (also Romanized as Zemīdān-e Bālā) is a village in Layl Rural District, in the Central District of Lahijan County, Gilan Province, Iran. At the 2006 census, its population was 44, in 11 families.

References 

Populated places in Lahijan County